Kingston High School may refer to:

Australia
Kingston High School (Tasmania), Kingston, Tasmania

United Kingdom
Kingston High School, Hull, East Riding of Yorkshire

United States
 Kingston High School (Arkansas), Kingston, Arkansas
 Kingston High School (New York), Kingston, New York
 Kingston High School (Washington),  Kingston, Washington

See also
KHS (disambiguation)
Kingston Grammar School